Joseba Llorente Etxarri (born 24 November 1979) is a Spanish retired professional footballer who played as a centre-forward.

He amassed La Liga totals of 179 games and 50 goals over ten seasons, representing in the competition Real Sociedad, Valladolid, Villarreal and Osasuna. He added 142 matches and 55 goals in the Segunda División, mainly in service of Eibar.

Club career
Born in Hondarribia, Basque Country, Llorente came through the ranks of Real Sociedad, making his debut for the first team on 3 October 1999 against Real Zaragoza (2–0 away loss). He would however, only total 23 appearances in four seasons, and left in 2003 for another club in his native region, SD Eibar of the Segunda División, where he already had served a loan stint early into the 2000–01 campaign.

For 2005–06, Llorente signed for Real Valladolid also in that tier, and scored 12 league goals in his debut campaign. He added 17 the following year to help the team to achieve promotion as champions.

On 20 January 2008, in a match against RCD Espanyol, Llorente broke the Spanish league record for the fastest goal ever scored (7.82 seconds), beating Dario Silva's previous record at 8. He broke through that season aged almost 29, netting 16 times to help them retain top-flight status, including a hat-trick against Recreativo de Huelva on the 13th.

Llorente agreed a four-year deal with Villarreal CF on 26 May 2008, for an undisclosed fee. He scored his first goal for the club in a 2–1 win at CD Numancia on 21 September. Exactly one month later, he put three past AaB Football in a UEFA Champions League 6–3 home victory.

On 10 March 2009, after just minutes on the pitch, Llorente scored the winner in a 2–1 away defeat of Panathinaikos F.C. in the Champions League quarter-finals' second leg (3–2 aggregate). His first season at Villarreal was highly productive as he scored a squad-best 15 league goals, including two at FC Barcelona in a 3–3 draw on 10 May, postponing the Catalans' title-winning celebrations for a further week.

On 16 June 2010, after another good year with the Valencians, Llorente rejoined Real Sociedad – recently returned to the top tier – penning a four-year contract worth €2.5 million. In his competitive debut, on 29 August, he assisted Xabi Prieto with a backheel for the game's only goal, at home against former side Villarreal; in mid-January 2011, however, after suffering a back injury, he was sidelined for the remainder of the season.

Career statistics

Honours
Valladolid
Segunda División: 2006–07

References

External links

1979 births
Living people
People from Hondarribia
Spanish footballers
Footballers from the Basque Country (autonomous community)
Association football forwards
La Liga players
Segunda División players
Segunda División B players
Tercera División players
Real Sociedad B footballers
Real Sociedad footballers
SD Eibar footballers
Real Valladolid players
Villarreal CF players
CA Osasuna players
Basque Country international footballers